Dahaneh-ye Sar-e Sefidrud-e Kohneh (also Romanized as Dahaneh-ye Sar-e Sefīdrūd-e Kohneh; also known as Dahaneh Sar and Dahaneh-ye Sar-e Sefīdrūd) is a village in Dehgah Rural District, Kiashahr District, Astaneh-ye Ashrafiyeh County, Gilan Province, Iran. At the 2006 census, its population was 638, in 179 families.

References 

Populated places in Astaneh-ye Ashrafiyeh County